WFIV-FM (105.3 FM) is a radio station broadcasting an oldies format. Licensed to the suburb of Loudon, Tennessee it serves the Knoxville metropolitan area including Farragut. It first began broadcasting in 1990 under the call sign WJDG. The station is currently owned by Horne Radio.

History
After being assigned the call sign "WJDG" on April 13, 1990, WFIV-FM changed call signs briefly to "WESK" in March 1991. In May 1991 the call sign was again changed to "WXST" but was changed back to "WESK" on March 16, 1998. In February 2000 the station adopted an '80s format with the call sign WKVL-FM; the station would switch from talk back to 80s music many times up until November 1, 2005. That is when the station switched to the WFIV-FM call sign.

WFIV adopted an eclectic variety format, referred to by the radio industry as Adult Album Alternative (AAA).

Syndicated programming on WFIV included The House of Blues Hour, as well as Little Steven's Underground Garage hosted by Little Steven.

On March 1, 2010, the station "relaunched" as "i-105," "Knoxville's Independent Radio", maintaining the Adult Alternative format but dropping any reference to their actual studio location in Farragut.

On September 4, 2020, WFIV changed formats from adult alternative to oldies, branded as "105.3 WFIV".

Previous logo

References

External links
 Official WFIV website

Oldies radio stations in the United States
FIV-FM
Radio stations established in 1990